ICI Fibres developed the Crimplene fibre. It is a thick, polyester yarn used to make a fabric of the same name. The resulting cloth is heavy, wrinkle-resistant and retains its shape well. Britain's defunct ICI Laboratory developed the fibre in the early 1950s and named it after the Crimple Valley in which the company was situated.
An alternative reason for the name chosen is that is crimped (i.e. bulked up) Terylene.

Imperial Chemical Industries